Glamping is a portmanteau of "glamorous" and "camping", and describes a style of camping with amenities and, in some cases, resort-style services not usually associated with "traditional" camping. Glamping has become particularly popular with 21st-century tourists seeking modern amenities, such as Wi-Fi, alongside "the escapism and adventure recreation of camping", in a variety of accommodations such as cabins, treehouses, and tents.

History
The word "glamping" first appeared in the United Kingdom in 2005 and was added to the Oxford English Dictionary in 2016. The word is new, but the concept that "glamping" connotes, that of luxurious tent-living (or living in other camping accommodations), is not. In the 16th century, the Scottish Earl of Atholl prepared a lavish experience in the Highlands for the visiting King James V and his mother. Here, the Duke pitched lavish tents and filled them with all the provisions of his own home palace.

Probably the most extravagant example of palatial tent-living in history was the Field of the Cloth of Gold, a diplomatic summit in 1520 between Francis I of France and Henry VIII of England in northern France. Some 2,800 tents and marquees were erected, and fountains ran with red wine.

At around the same time, the Ottomans had ostentatious, palatial tents transported from one military mission to the next. Entire teams of artisans travelled with the army to erect and maintain these imperial tents. As described by Professor Nurhan Atasoy,

Recent trends 
Some 400 years later, in the 1920s, an African safari became "the thing to do" among wealthy Americans and British. But wealthy travelers, even those in search of adventure, were not willing to sacrifice comfort or luxury. From electric generators, to folding baths, and cases of champagne, travelers were afforded every domestic luxury while on adventure.

Others have suggested that recent interest in glamping can be traced back to the 1990s, as safari camps became increasingly popular in Africa and coastal Thailand. In 2011, CNN reported that glamping had also become popular in the United States, Europe, and Australia. The modern version of glamping offers holidaymakers with "spacious designer-outfitted tents complete with soft sheets instead of sweaty sleeping bags". By minimizing the impact on the environment of constantly unpacking tents and poorly discarding waste, glamping is also arguably environmentally friendly.

Since 2020, the tourism industry has seen renewed interest in glamping, due to the global outbreak of the COVID-19 pandemic, because it allows for social distancing and provides opportunities for outdoor recreation.

See also
 Bell tent
 Ecotourism
 Shepherd's hut
 Tree house
 Yurt

References

External links 
 

2010s fads and trends
Camping
Types of tourism